Giannis Dalianidis (31 December 1923 – 16 October 2010) was a Greek film director.

His first film was Mousitsa, released in 1959, which was followed by a series of musicals. Between 1974 and 1981, he produced the television series Luna Park.  In 2002, he was dubbed a "national film hero" at the International Thessaloniki Film Festival.

Biography
Giannis Dalianidis was born in Thessaloniki on 31 December 1923. He started his career as a dancer under the nickname Giannis Dal. From 1958, he worked in cinema, initially as a screenwriter and afterwards as a director. In 1959 he directed his first film, Mousitsa and sometime later Laos kai Kolonaki. 

In 1961 he started to cooperate with the Finos Films the most successful Greek film production company. He directed such films as The Downhill, Liar Wanted, and Gorgones ke Manges, among others. Dalianidis mainly excelled in musical films. This genre, in Greece, is today closely related with Dalianidis. He has directed over 70 films and 10 television series.

Selected filmography
The Downhill  (1961)
Liar Wanted  (1961)
Nomos 4000 (1962)  
O atsidas (1962) 
Merikoi to protimoun kryo  (1962)
Iligos (1963)
Kati na Kaiei (1964)
I chartopaichtra  (1964)
Teddy Boy agapi mou  (1965)
Istoria mias zois  (1965)
Kiss the Girls (1965)
Fonazei o kleftis (1965)
Gorgones ke Manges (1968)
Gymnoi sto dromo (1969)
O katergaris (1971)
Marijuana Stop! (1971)
Erastes tou oneirou (1974)

References

External links

Obituary , ana-mpa.gr; accessed 19 February 2018.

1923 births
2010 deaths
Greek film directors
Mass media people from Thessaloniki
Deaths from organ failure
Greek Macedonians